Album1 (stylized as album1) is the debut full-length studio album by Dutch DJ, musician, record producer and composer, San Holo. It was self-released on 21 September 2018, by his independent record label, bitbird. The album features guest appearances from Sofie Winterson, Bipolar Sunshine, James Vincent McMorrow, Yvette Young, Cassini, The Nicholas, Duskus, Caspian and Fazerdaze.  The album was supported by six singles: "Worthy", "Lift Me from the Ground", "Brighter Days", "Forever Free", "Surface", and "Voices In My Head".

Following its release, album1 debuted at number seven on the Billboard Dance/Electronic Albums chart for the week of 6 October 2018, becoming Holo's first top ten album. Simultaneously, three singles from album1 entered the Dance/Electronic Songs chart for the tracking week of 6 October 2018; "Lift Me from the Ground" re-entered the charts at No. 39, while "Show Me" and "Brighter Days" debuted at numbers 42 and 49, respectively. album1 was nominated for the Edison Pop Award's Best Dance Album of 2019.

Background
Much of the album was written and recorded from a home studio Holo created from an Airbnb rented in Vestal Avenue in Los Angeles. Unlike most conventional EDM albums, Holo focused on writing and recording with live instruments and using analog tape recorders through the recording process.

The songs on album1 are combined of heavy melodic vocals, guitar riffs, violins, drum beats, and future bass elements. The album draws heavily from San Holo's post-rock inspiration and influences with a contemporary EDM sound in a new sound Holo describes as "post-EDM".

From May 2018 through early July 2018, Holo released snippets of behind-the-scenes footage from unreleased songs including, "Forever Free" and "Worthy". On 26 July 2018, the snippets were revealed to be part of an album release in a video announcement from Sander revealing his debut album album1.

On 3 August 2018, Holo released two singles from the album, "Worthy" and "Lift Me from the Ground" on bitbird while also announcing an upcoming tour for the album. "Lift Me from the Ground" debuted at No. 42 on the Billboard Hot Dance/Electronic Songs chart the week of 18 August 2018.

On 31 August 2018, another single from album1 was released: "Brighter Days", featuring singer Bipolar Sunshine, with an official lyric video for the track. San Holo and Bipolar Sunshine jointly performed the song together at the 3FM Awards on September 5.

Pre-orders for album1 were opened on 7 September 2018, alongside an announcement of an album release date of 21 September via his Twitter. Another single from album1 was released on 14 September 2018, "Forever Free" featuring Duskus.

In the week leading up to the album's release on 21 September, two more singles from the album were released, "Surface" featuring post-rock band Caspian with uncredited vocals by Fazerdaze on the 17th, and "Voices in My Head" featuring The Nicholas on the 19th.

Speaking to Forbes, Holo described the album as "electronic music, but with this new album I’m working on I’m putting a lot of organic, real sounds in there to build a bridge between the EDM world and the more indie world until it becomes one."

Critical reception

The album has received generally favorable reviews from critics.

album1 placed number two on Billboards Critic's Pick Top 10 Best Dance/Electronic Albums of 2018. "album1 is notable for its innovative use of organic instrumentation and analog recording techniques...It's a powerful listen, and there's nothing like seeing San Holo rip a guitar solo while standing in front of his enthralling production, live on stage" said Kat Bein, from Billboard Dance. Brian Bonavoglia from ThisSongSlaps ranked album1 as the top album of 2018 and claims, "[album1] is one of the most forward-things productions we've seen all year." Molly Hudelson from Substream magazine exclaims, "album1 will take you on an emotional journey from start to finish, but rather than forcing a certain emotion at any point, it feels incredibly cathartic. Whether you've been busy with school or work, stressed out by family troubles, or overwhelmed by whatever difficult life circumstances you’re facing at the moment, what we all crave in those moments is a relief...album1 will gently guide you along in letting it all out." EDMSauce editor Sophia Medina confesses, "this was definitely the first album, in a very long time, that I actually enjoyed all the songs on the album. If you couldn't tell already, I’m strongly into songs that can not only touch my heart but can stir my emotions at the same time. This album did just that. My emotions were everywhere! I feel like if an album can create some sort of sentimental connection, then it's one that should definitely be acknowledged." The Nocturnal Times praises album1 to their readers, "there's no surprise the album garnered mass critical acclaim and is a favorite among dance music enthusiasts alike." album1 was ranked number one on the top electronic/dance albums of 2018. Matt Meadow of Your EDM named it their third best album of 2018 adding that "the 12-track album is said to bridge progressive rock with dance music, utilizing a vastly different style of arrangement than most dance music fans are used to. In addition, San brings his soft and powerful guitar riffs into the mix for a deeply personalized production with his signature sound attached to each and every note."

Accolades

Track listingNotes'''
 All track titles are stylized in all lowercase.

Charts

Release history

Touring
Kicking off on 31 October 2018, album1 tour embarked on a 35-date North American tour starting in St. Petersburg, Florida, and wrapping up in Seattle, Washington. It will have support from Taska Black, Duskus, Eastghost, Chet Porter, Baynk, Slow Magic, Said The Sky, The Nicholas, and BeauDamian on select dates.

"I am always thinking into the future and this new music and the tour, I hope will stretch the boundaries within the EDM community to new levels.  Singing and playing guitar gives the set a stronger, livelier feel." - Sander van DijckOn 3 December 2018, San Holo announced his biggest European headline tour to date, weaving through 12 cities across 7 countries with more dates to still be announced. The tour will start in March 2019 and will run the entire duration of the month culminating in a headline show his home country, The Netherlands, at the famed Paradiso in Amsterdam.

On 22 January 2019, Holo announced on Instagram an extended album1'' North American tour across 17 cities, hitting markets Holo missed during the initial North American tour in 2018. The tour will start in Sacramento, CA and will run the entire duration of the month ending in Chicago, IL.

References 

2018 debut albums
San Holo albums
Music published by Bitbird